The 2004–05 Segunda Liga season was the 15th season of the competition and the 71st season of recognised second-tier football in Portugal.

Overview
The league was contested by 18 teams with FC Paços de Ferreira winning the championship and gaining promotion to the Primeira Liga along with Naval 1º Maio and Estrela Amadora. At the other end of the table SC Espinho were relegated to the Segunda Divisão along with FC Felgueiras who were relegated for financial reasons. Finally 13th placed FC Alverca gave up professional football.

League standings

Footnotes

External links
 Portugal 2004/05 - RSSSF (Jorge Santos, Jan Schoenmakers and Daniel Dalence)
 Portuguese II Liga 2004/2005 - footballzz.co.uk

Liga Portugal 2 seasons
Port
2004–05 in Portuguese football leagues